Terry Moor (born April 23, 1952) is a former tennis player from the United States, who won two singles and three doubles titles during his professional career.

The left-hander reached his highest singles ATP-ranking on October 29, 1984, when he became world No. 32.

He is currently a database programmer in Memphis, TN.

Grand Slam finals

Doubles

Career finals

Singles (2 titles, 4 runner-ups)

Doubles (3 titles, 7 runner-ups)

External links
 
 

1952 births
Living people
American male tennis players
Louisiana–Monroe Warhawks men's tennis players
Sportspeople from Hartford, Connecticut
Sportspeople from Memphis, Tennessee
Tennis people from Connecticut
Tennis people from Tennessee